Polygala cymosa, the tall pinebarren milkwort, is a species of flowering plant in the family Polygalaceae. It is endemic to the United States.

References

cymosa